Joseph Sylvain Dorilla Turgeon (born January 17, 1965) is a Canadian former professional ice hockey player who played 669 games in the National Hockey League (NHL).

Playing career
Turgeon was drafted by the Hartford Whalers in the 1983 NHL Entry Draft as the second overall pick. During his NHL career he played for the Whalers, the New Jersey Devils, the Montreal Canadiens and the Ottawa Senators.

Turgeon scored 40 goals as a rookie for the Whalers in the 1983–84 NHL season, establishing career highs of 45 goals, 34 assists and 79 points for the Whalers in the 1985–86 season, and he scored 30 or more goals four times in his NHL career. However, he suffered a major abdominal injury in 1986–87 and would not reach the same highs again.

In 1989, Turgeon was traded from the Whalers to the Devils for Pat Verbeek, and scored 30 goals in 72 games in his only season with the team. In 1990, he was traded from the Devils to the Canadiens for Claude Lemieux, in a lopsided trade, as Turgeon only scored 15 goals in 75 games over two seasons for the Canadiens, while Lemieux produced 125 goals for the Devils in the next five seasons and won the Conn Smythe Trophy while leading the Devils to the Stanley Cup in 1995.

Turgeon's final NHL season was 1994–95 with the Senators. He spent 1995–96 with the Houston Aeros in the International Hockey League, where he scored 28 goals and 31 assists for 59 points in 65 games. From 1996 to 2002, he played for various European teams in Germany, Switzerland and Italy.

Personal life
Turgeon is the older brother of former NHL player Pierre Turgeon. They are the only two brothers in NHL history to be selected in the No. 1 and 2 slots of the draft (in separate years).  His nephew, Dominic Turgeon (Pierre's son), was drafted by the Detroit Red Wings in the 2014 NHL Entry Draft.

Awards and achievements
Named to the NHL All-Rookie Team in 1983–84.

Career statistics

Regular season and playoffs

International

External links

See also
Notable families in the NHL

1965 births
Bolzano HC players
Canadian ice hockey left wingers
EHC Olten players
Hartford Whalers draft picks
Hartford Whalers players
HC Thurgau players
Houston Aeros (1994–2013) players
Hull Olympiques players
Sportspeople from Rouyn-Noranda
Kassel Huskies players
Living people
Montreal Canadiens players
National Hockey League first-round draft picks
New Jersey Devils players
Ottawa Senators players
Revier Löwen players
SC Herisau players
SCL Tigers players
Wedemark Scorpions players
Ice hockey people from Quebec
Canadian expatriate ice hockey players in Germany